São Toméan Portuguese ( or ) is a dialect of Portuguese spoken in São Tomé and Príncipe.

It contains many archaic features in pronunciation, vocabulary, grammar, and syntax, similar to Angolan Portuguese. It was once the dialect of the owners of the roças and the middle class, but now it is the dialect of the lower and middle classes, as the upper class often uses modern European Portuguese standard pronunciation, which is now also used by lower and middle classes.

São Tomé is the third country in order of percentage of Portuguese speakers (after Portugal and Brazil), with more than 95% of the population speaking Portuguese, and more than 50% using it as their first language. The rest of the population speaks Portuguese creoles.

The Portuguese language is undeniably the most spoken and promoted language in the
archipelago, being spoken by 98.4% of the population, including by official means. However, the variety chosen as target and
loaded with social prestige is still European Portuguese, which generates a series of problems,
considering that it is a different variety from that current in the everyday life of speakers. so much in
São Tomé and Príncipe, varieties of the Portuguese language emerge from the use and also contact with local languages.

Phonology
The vowel frame in Portuguese is formed by 7 vowels in the tonic context [i, u, e, o, a, E, O], which distances it from EP and brings it closer to BP. As for the pretonic, in the Portuguese spoken in São Tomé and Príncipe, 5 vowels occupy this position, being the same as in BP [i, u, o, e, a]. However, high middle vowels can be raised and perceived as [i, u]. With regard to vowel raising in this variety, this process is linked to the age group of the speakers, with younger people being the ones who perform it the most, which suggests an ongoing change. 

Pretonic in São Tomé and Príncipe Portuguese tends towards a set of only 3 vowels [i, u, a]. In non-final posttonic, there is also an increase in high mid vowels, according to the author. Thus, Sao Tome Portuguese has 3 vowels in this position [i, u, a]. 

In the context of final posttonics, as in European Portuguese and Brazilian Portuguese, there are only 3 vowels, all executed in a reduced form [I, U, 6]. Regarding portuguese from São Tomé diphthongs, based on the analysis of a corpus with 3,017 words that have diphthongs in their underlying form, it was found that there was monophthongization in 49% of the data. The use of rhotics in Sao Tome Portuguese is an innovative feature, which distinguishes this variety from other varieties of Portuguese, such as Brazilian and Lusitanian. Some speakers produce the vibratory alveolar consonant [r] in positions within the word that does not exist in the Portuguese spoken in Brazil and Portugal.

Added to this is the emergence of the voiced uvular fricative [R\] as a variant that clearly distinguishes two generations of Portuguese speakers, those under 39 and those over 40, or those born before or after the independence of the country. The fact that those born after independence use this variant more is linked to the construction of a Santomean identity, a way of distinguishing Portuguese from European, used by former colonizers. Although there is a pejorative idea among São Toméans around the use of the voiced uvular fricative [R\], which involves many questions of national identity.

See also 
 Portuguese in Equatorial Guinea
 Mozambican Portuguese
 Papiamento

References

Further reading

External links 
 Bibliography on São Tomean Portuguese
 Português é crescentemente a língua materna
 Língua de São Tomé e Príncipe: Crioulo? Dialecto? Ou Português?
  Português em São Tomé e Príncipe
 Universo linguístico de São Tomé e Príncipe
 Aménagement linguistique dans le monde, São Tomé-et-Príncipe

Portuguese dialects
Portuguese diaspora in São Tomé and Príncipe
Portuguese language in Africa